Mr Price Group is a cash-based fashion-value retailer, and is a public company listed on the Johannesburg Stock Exchange. Established in 1985, the retailer has 2,543 stores which are mainly in South Africa, as well as online channels. The company operates through four segments: Apparel, Homeware, Financial Services and Telecoms. The company’s trading divisions are as follows: 
 Mr Price
 Mr Price Sport – formed in 2006
 Mr Price Home
 Miladys – acquired in 1987
 Sheet Street – acquired in 1996
 Mr Price Money – formed in 2007
 Power Fashion – acquired in 2020
 YuppieChef – acquired in 2021
 Studio 88 – acquired in 2022

External links
 https://www.mrpricegroup.com/

Companies based in Durban
Retail companies established in 1985
Companies listed on the Johannesburg Stock Exchange
Retail companies of South Africa
Sportswear brands
South African brands
Mobile phone companies of South Africa
Companies based in KwaZulu-Natal